Lieutenant General Sir Roderick Alexander 'Roddy' Cordy-Simpson  (born 29 February 1944) is a retired British Army officer.

Career
Educated at Radley College, Roddy Cordy-Simpson was commissioned into the 13th/18th Hussars in February 1966. He was deployed to Bosnia as Chief of Staff of the United Nations Protection Force in 1992 and was appointed General Officer Commanding 1st (UK) Armoured Division in 1994. He was deployed to Bosnia again in December 1996 as Deputy Force Commander Operations for the Stabilisation Force (SFOR).

In March 2001 he was appointed Lieutenant of the Tower of London, leaving that role in March 2004. Having settled at Bishopstrow in Wiltshire, he was appointed a Deputy Lieutenant of Wiltshire in 2004. He was awarded the CB in June 1993 and the KBE in the New Year Honours List 1998.

He was Vice Lord Lieutenant of Wiltshire from 2016 to 2019.

References

|-

1944 births
Living people
British Army lieutenant generals
13th/18th Royal Hussars officers
Knights Commander of the Order of the British Empire
Companions of the Order of the Bath
People educated at Radley College
Deputy Lieutenants of Wiltshire